Juri Hollmann (born 30 August 1999 in Berlin) is a German cyclist, who currently rides for UCI WorldTeam .

Major results
2016
 Junior National Track Championships
1st  Team pursuit (with Carlos Ambrosius, Richard Banusch & Bastian Flicke)
2nd Individual pursuit
 9th Overall La Coupe du Président de la Ville de Grudziądz
1st Stage 1a (TTT)
2017
 1st Overall Internationale Cottbuser Junioren-Etappenfahrt
1st Stage 2a (ITT)
 4th Time trial, UCI Junior Road World Championships
 8th Overall Internationale Niedersachsen-Rundfahrt der Junioren
2018
 6th Overall Szlakiem Walk Majora Hubala
2019
 3rd Time trial, National Under-23 Road Championships

References

External links

1999 births
Living people
German male cyclists
Cyclists from Berlin
21st-century German people